Wei Wei (魏微) is the pen name of Wei Lili (魏丽丽, born 1970), a Chinese writer. She was born in Shuyang County, Jiangsu, studied in Huai'an and Nanjing, and currently lives in Guangzhou.

Works translated to English

"Big Lao Zheng's Woman" won the 3rd Lu Xun Literary Prize in 2004.

References

People from Shuyang County
Writers from Suqian
20th-century Chinese writers
21st-century Chinese novelists
Chinese women novelists
1970 births
Living people
Chinese women short story writers
21st-century Chinese short story writers
21st-century Chinese women writers
20th-century Chinese women writers
People's Republic of China novelists
People's Republic of China short story writers
Short story writers from Jiangsu